Harverd Dropout is the second studio album by American rapper Lil Pump. It was released through Tha Lights Global and Warner Records on February 22, 2019. The album was met with mixed reviews from critics and debuted at number seven on the Billboard 200. It includes features from Kanye West, Smokepurpp, Migos rappers Offset and Quavo, Lil Uzi Vert, Lil Wayne, YG, and 2 Chainz. It follows his self-titled debut studio album (2017).

Background
Lil Pump released his eponymous self-titled studio album in October 2017. In January 2018, he announced his second project Harverd Dropout, which was finished in April 2018. The project was initially planned to be released on August 17, 2018, Garcia's 18th birthday, but was postponed due to Lil Pump "losing the album".

Following Garcia's arrest on August 29, 2018, for unlicensed driving, Garcia's management team announced the release date of Harverd Dropout to be September 14, 2018. A week later, on September 6, 2018, Lil Pump teamed up with American rapper Kanye West for the song "I Love It" with comedian Adele Givens. The song was released by Lil Pump's management team.

The September 14, 2018, release date was also canceled. In October 2018, he released the song "Multi Millionaire" with Lil Uzi Vert.

"Butterfly Doors" was released on January 4, 2019. Lil Pump then posted the cover art on his social media accounts on January 23, 2019, along with announcing the album's release date as February 22.

On January 31, 2019, "Racks on Racks" was released along with its music video. A day before the album's release, "Be Like Me" featuring Lil Wayne was released as the seventh single.

The album was released on digital streaming platforms on February 22, 2019.

Critical reception

Harverd Dropout received mixed to negative reviews from music critics. At Metacritic, which assigns a normalized rating out of 100 to reviews from mainstream publications, the album received a score of 46, based on eight reviews, indicating "mixed or average reviews". 

Luke Morgan Britton of NME wrote that much of the album felt like "little more than regurgitated punchlines or uninspired variations on themes already set up and adequately executed on the rapper's early tracks." Alphonse Pierre of Pitchfork felt that by the time of the album's release, Lil Pump's act had become contrived, writing, "Having abandoned his lo-fi roots in the South Florida rap scene, Lil Pump has become a caricature of himself. His second album is sometimes fun but mostly unnecessary." In a negative review, Tommy Monroe of Consequence of Sound felt that the album was weighed down by "songs without structure, lines without meaning, and hooks without melody," calling the release "utterly tasteless." Nick Soulsby of PopMatters heavily criticized the album for its lack of depth and its repetitive nature, writing, "Lil Pump's ambition apparently goes no further than having one song slip onto a party playlist and make just enough impact people occasionally ask for 'that song where the guy says...' having caught the couple of words he's hammered over and over."

Conversely, in a positive review, A.D. Amorosi of Variety wrote that although Lil Pump's style or flow hadn't changed since his initial singles or his self-titled album debut, his songs "[helped] turn trap into a pop-hop vibe," describing the album as "simplistic, contagiously catchy, and occasionally enhanced by rousing choruses." Writing for HipHopDX, Scott Glaysher praised the album's production, while taking note of its polished vocals and improved mixing. He wrote that "the beats are big and brazen" and that "the choruses are wildly catchy and some of the featured guests even get off some decently solid verses."

Commercial performance
Harverd Dropout debuted at number seven on the US Billboard 200 with 48,000 album-equivalent units, of which 25,000 were pure album sales. It is Lil Pump's second US top 10 album.

Track listing
Credits adapted from ASCAP, BMI and Tidal.

Personnel
Credits adapted from Tidal.

 CBMix – mixing , mastering , recording

Charts

Certifications

References

External links
 

2019 albums
Lil Pump albums
Albums produced by Cubeatz
Albums produced by Kanye West
Albums produced by Ronny J
Warner Records albums